In mathematics, Roth's theorem is a fundamental result in diophantine approximation to algebraic numbers. It is of a qualitative type, stating that algebraic numbers cannot have many rational number approximations that are 'very good'.

Statement 

Roth's theorem states that every irrational algebraic number  has approximation exponent equal to 2. This means that, for every , the inequality

Roth's proof of this fact resolved a conjecture by Siegel. It follows that every irrational algebraic number α satisfies

Discussion

The first result in this direction is Liouville's theorem on approximation of algebraic numbers, which gives an approximation exponent of d for an algebraic number α of degree d ≥ 2. This is already enough to demonstrate the existence of transcendental numbers. Thue realised that an exponent less than d would have applications to the solution of Diophantine equations and in Thue's theorem from 1909 established an exponent  which he applied to prove the finiteness of the solutions of Thue equation.

Roth's result with exponent 2 is in some sense the best possible, because this statement would fail on setting : by Dirichlet's theorem on diophantine approximation there are infinitely many solutions in this case.  However, there is a stronger conjecture of Serge Lang  that

can have only finitely many solutions in integers p and q.  If one lets α run over the whole of the set of real numbers, not just the algebraic reals, then both Roth's conclusion and Lang's  hold
for almost all . So both the theorem and the conjecture assert that a certain countable set misses a certain set of measure zero.

The theorem is not currently effective: that is, there is no bound known on the possible values of p,q given .   showed that Roth's techniques could be used to give an effective bound for the number of  p/q satisfying the inequality, using a "gap" principle.   The fact that we do not actually know C(ε) means that the project of solving the equation, or bounding the size of the solutions, is out of reach.

Proof technique 

The proof technique involves constructing an auxiliary multivariate polynomial in an arbitrarily large number of variables depending upon , leading to a contradiction in the presence of too many good approximations. More specifically, one finds a certain number of rational approximations to the irrational algebraic number in question, and then applies the function over each of these simultaneously (i.e. each of these rational numbers serve as the input to a unique variable in the expression defining our function). By its nature, it was ineffective (see effective results in number theory); this is of particular interest since a major application of this type of result is to bound the number of solutions of some diophantine equations.

Generalizations 

There is a higher-dimensional version, Schmidt's subspace theorem, of the basic result. There are also numerous extensions, for example using the p-adic metric, based on the Roth method.

William J. LeVeque generalized the result by showing that a similar bound holds when the approximating numbers are taken from a fixed algebraic number field.  Define the height H(ξ) of an algebraic number ξ to be the maximum of the absolute values of the coefficients of its minimal polynomial.  Fix κ>2.  For a given algebraic number α and algebraic number field K, the equation

has only finitely many solutions in elements ξ of K.

See also
Davenport–Schmidt theorem
Granville–Langevin conjecture
Størmer's theorem
Diophantine geometry

Notes

References

Further reading
 
 
 
 

Diophantine approximation
Theorems in number theory
Algebraic numbers